Darrell L. Johnson, also known as K-Dee, formerly Kid Disaster and D-Rock-D, (born May 24, 1969), is an American rapper most known for his album Ass, Gas, or Cash (No One Rides for Free). 

His first two singles were released under the name D-Rock-D. Those two songs "My Fresh Nissan" and "Killer Daytons" were released in 1986 and 1987 and appear on the compilation album West Coast Rap-thology.

He then came into wider prominence in the hip hop scene with fellow West Coast rapper, Ice Cube in the group C.I.A. 

He became a part of Cube's entourage Da Lench Mob and made appearances on other Lench Mob member albums including Mack 10, Dazzie Dee, Westside Connection, and Kausion. 

Other appearances including the compilation albums, The Lawhouse Experience, Volume One, Dangerous Ground soundtrack, Big Thangs released in 1997 and the Devin the Dude album, The Dude, released in 1998. 

In 2005, K-Dee released a song online titled "Back On Deck" and also a mixtape song over Rick Ross "Hustlin" titled "Cuffin Em". In 2012, he was featured on a new Dazzie Dee song called "All The Time".

Discography

Studio albums

Singles

Guest appearances
1987: "Panic Zone" N.W.A from N.W.A. and the Posse
1993: "Make It Ruff, Make It Smooth" (Ice Cube featuring K-Dee) from Lethal Injection
1994: "Mellow Madness" (Da Lench Mob featuring Ice Cube, K-Dee & Bootsy Collins) from Planet of Da Apes
1995: "H.O.E.K." (Mack 10 featuring K-Dee) from Mack 10
1995: "Supersperm" (Kausion featuring K-Dee) from South Central Los Skanless
1996: "Aint No Bustas This Way" (Dazzie Dee featuring Ice Cube & K-Dee) from Re-Birth
1996: "Do You Like Criminals?" (Westside Connection featuring K-Dee) from Bow Down
1996: "Hoo Bangin (WSCG Style)" (Westside Connection featuring The Comrads, Allfrumtha I & K-Dee) from Bow Down
1997: "World Wide" (K-Dee) from The Lawhouse Experience, Volume One
1997: "Make Money" (CJ Mac & K-Dee) from the Ant Banks album, Big Thangs
1997: "Fa-Sho" (K-Dee) from Dangerous Ground soundtrack
1998: "One Day at a Time" (Devin the Dude featuring K-Dee & K.B.) from The Dude
1998: "Can't Change Me" (Devin the Dude featuring K-Dee & K.B.) from The Dude
2003: "Mo-Chedda: (K-Dee) from Xchange soundtrack
2005: "Back On Deck" (K-Dee)
2012: "All The Time" (Dazzie Dee featuring K-Dee) from the upcoming The 7th Letter

References

Living people
Rappers from Los Angeles
1969 births
Gangsta rappers
21st-century American rappers